On November 7, 1818, a special election was held in  to fill a vacancy caused by Daniel M. Forney (DR)'s resignation earlier that year.

Election results

This seat changed parties after the special election.  Davidson took his seat on December 2 during the Second Session of the 15th Congress.

See also
List of special elections to the United States House of Representatives

References

Special elections to the 15th United States Congress
1818 11
North Carolina 1818 11
1818 North Carolina elections
United States House of Representatives 1818 11
North Carolina 11